The Boise City Council is the governing body of the City of Boise, Idaho. The council is composed of six members elected at-large for four-year terms. Three of the six seats are elected in November every odd-numbered year.

Regular council meetings are held at Boise City Hall on Tuesdays at 6:00 PM, except on the fourth Tuesday of the month when they are held at 12:00 PM. Special meetings may be called by the Mayor of Boise or by a majority of the Boise City Council. Work sessions are usually held the afternoon before regular meetings.

Members

Members of the Boise City Council as of January 2020:

Presiding Officer
Mayor Lauren McLean (ex officio)

Officers:
Council President: Elaine Clegg, Seat 5
President Pro Tempore: Holli Woodings, Seat 6

Members:
Patrick Bageant, Seat 1
Jimmy Hallyburton, Seat 3
Lisa Sánchez, Seat 2
Luci Willits, Council District 1, Seat 1

See also

Ada County Board of Commissioners

References

External links
Boise City Council Website

Boise, Idaho
City councils in the United States